Boronia bowmanii is a plant in the citrus family, Rutaceae and is endemic to Queensland. It is an erect shrub with pinnate leaves and four-petalled flowers.

Description

Taxonomy and naming
Boronia bowmanii was first formally described in 1864 by Ferdinand von Mueller and the description was published in Fragmenta phytographiae Australiae. The specific epithet honours Edward Macarthur Bowman who collected the type specimen.

Distribution and habitat
This boronia grows in heath, woodland and forest on the Great Dividing Range from Bamaga south to Charters Towers and Pentland.

Conservation
Boronia bowmanii is classed as "least concern" under the Queensland Government Nature Conservation Act 1992.

References

bowmanii
Flora of Queensland
Plants described in 1864
Taxa named by Ferdinand von Mueller